College Football on NBC Sports is the de facto title used for broadcasts of NCAA college football games produced by NBC Sports. 

Via its experimental station W2XBS, NBC presented the first television broadcast of American football at any level on September 30, 1939, between the Fordham Rams and the Waynesburg Yellow Jackets. NBC held rights to the NCAA's regular-season game of the week package from 1952–53, 1955–59, and 1964–65. From 1952 to 1988, NBC was the broadcaster of the Rose Bowl Game. In 1990, NBC first acquired the rights to Notre Dame Fighting Irish home games, as well as the Bayou Classic—agreements that have continued to this day, and have most recently been renewed through 2025. 

After Comcast's acquisition of NBC Universal, Versus—later renamed NBC Sports Network (NBCSN)—was merged into the NBC Sports division in 2011; by then, the network's coverage of Division I FBS football (billed as College Football on NBC Sports Network) was limited to a contract with the Mountain West that ended in 2012, and a package of Pac-10 games that had been sub-licensed by the Fox Sports Networks. NBCSN subsequently acquired packages of Division I FCS games from the Colonial Athletic Association (CAA) and Ivy League; both contracts ended in 2017. 

The Bayou Classic moved from the NBC broadcast network to NBCSN in 2015, but moved back to NBC in 2022. From 2015 to 2020, NBCSN also broadcast selected Notre Dame home games not televised by NBC; since 2020, NBC Sports has preferred using Peacock or other NBCUniversal channels (such as USA Network and CNBC) to carry college football games not aired by the main network. In August 2022, NBC Sports announced that it had acquired a share of the Big Ten's football rights beginning in 2023, which will include Big Ten Saturday Night games in primetime on NBC, and a package of games on Peacock.

History

Experimental broadcasts and the Game of the Week, bowl games 

On September 30, 1939. NBC broadcast a game between Waynesburg and Fordham on station W2XBS (which would eventually become NBC's flagship station, WNBC) with one camera and Bill Stern as play-by-play announcer. With an estimated audience of 1,000 television sets, it was the first American football game to ever be broadcast via television. Twelve years later, the first live regular season college football game to be broadcast coast-to-coast by NBC—featuring Duke at Pittsburgh—was broadcast on September 29, 1951.

Under an argument that television broadcasts of football games would be detrimental to in-person attendance, the NCAA voted to prohibit the broadcast of any regular-season college football game without its permission, and establish an exclusive, NCAA-controlled broadcast rights package, consisting of one game per-week. Teams would be limited to one national television appearance per-season. This "game of the week" package was first sold to NBC in 1952 under a one-year contract for $1.144 million.  By 1953, the NCAA allowed NBC to add what it called "panorama" coverage of multiple regional broadcasts for certain weeks—shifting national viewers to the most interesting game during its telecast. 

After NBC lost its college football contract following the 1953 season, NBC regained college football rights in 1955 and aired games through the 1959 season.  NBC regained the NCAA contract for the 1964 and 1965 seasons.

Even after losing the rights to regular season college football in both 1959 and 1965, NBC continued to carry postseason football. NBC carried the Blue–Gray Football Classic, an all-star game, on Christmas Day, until dropping the game in 1963 as a protest of the game's policy of segregation. It consistently served as the Rose Bowl Game's television home from 1952 until 1988 (when it moved to ABC), and added the Sugar Bowl from 1958 to 1969 (which replaced the network's coverage of the Cotton Bowl Classic).

Notre Dame football 

In June 1984, the Supreme Court ruled in NCAA v. Board of Regents of University of Oklahoma that the NCAA's broadcast rights policy violated the Sherman Antitrust Act, and that individual universities and athletic conferences were free to sell the broadcast rights to their games. 67 NCAA schools pooled their broadcast rights as part of a group known as the College Football Association (CFA), which negotiated packages with networks on their behalf. 

By the late-1980's, the Notre Dame Fighting Irish—which had become one of the most recognizable teams on national television—had grown dissatisfied with the CFA and its contracts, which had an emphasis on regional games. In 1990, the Fighting Irish broke away from the CFA and announced that it would sign a five-year, $38 million contract with NBC to televise its home games beginning in 1991. Analysts felt that given the team's stature, it was inevitable that Notre Dame would eventually choose to negotiate its own television deal. It was also believed that the move would trigger a larger realignment of television rights in college football. This prediction would be realized when the Big East Conference and Southeastern Conference (SEC) also broke away, and signed with CBS Sports beginning in the 1995 season. The CFA eventually shut down in 1997.

Also in the 1991 season, NBC first acquired rights to the Bayou Classic, an annual rivalry game between Grambling State and Southern; the game was considered to be one of the first major, network television broadcasts of a college football game between historically black colleges and universities (HBCUs).

College Football on Versus (2006–2011)
In 2005, Comcast-owned cable network OLN—which would rebrand the following year as Versus—made an eight-year, $450 million offer for rights to a new late-season package of National Football League games. The network had been expanding into a mainstream sports service, having also recently acquired the cable rights to the National Hockey League. The NFL ultimately decided to decline offers by third-party broadcasters for the package, and chose to air the games on NFL Network instead. 

In January 2006, OLN announced that it would air Mountain West Conference college football beginning in the 2006 season under a multi-year deal. As part of the contract, Comcast also agreed to be a partner alongside CBS Corporation (owner of the conference's other rightsholder, CSTV) on the new MountainWest Sports Network—the first sports channel devoted to a single collegiate conference.  For its inaugural season of college football broadcasts in 2006, Gary Bender or Bob Papa served as the play-by-play announcer, with Glenn Parker as the analyst and Argy Stathapulos as the sideline reporter for Mountain West football game coverage.

In 2007, Fox Sports agreed to sub-license ten Big 12 and Pac-10 football games per-season from Fox Sports Net to Versus, replacing a package it had previously sub-licensed to TBS. The Big 12 sub-licensing deal concluded in 2010.

In 2008, Versus announced a contract with the Ivy League to broadcast at least three games each year beginning in the 2008 season, culminating with the annual Harvard–Yale rivalry game. The initial two-year contract was later renewed in 2010.

NBC Sports Group (2011–2019) 
In 2011, Comcast acquired a majority stake in NBC Universal, and merged its existing sports networks—including Versus, which was relaunched as NBC Sports Network (NBCSN) in January 2012—into the NBC Sports division. With the expansion of the Pac-10, Fox Sports decided to move some of its games to FX, while Versus would continue holding rights to seven games each season. The sub-licensing agreement ended in the 2012 season, when the newly-renamed Pac-12 began a new 12-year deal with Fox, ESPN, and the new conference-run Pac-12 Networks.

Ahead of the 2012 season, NBC Sports reached a five-year contract with the Colonial Athletic Association (CAA) to carry basketball and FCS football on its networks; football games would be carried on the Comcast SportsNet networks, with five games per-season airing on NBCSN—marking the first college sports contract reached by the merged division. NBC Sports also renewed its rights to the Ivy League for two additional seasons, with NBCSN carrying at least six to ten football games per-season. 

In 2013, NBCSN lost its share of Mountain West rights to ESPN. On April 9, 2013, NBC Sports renewed its broadcasting contract with Notre Dame through the 2025 season. As part of the contract, NBCSN also gained the rights to exclusively broadcast select Notre Dame home games.

In 2014, NBCSN lost a portion of the CAA rights to the American Sports Network, an upstart sports syndication service launched that year by the Sinclair Broadcast Group. NBCSN also initially declined to renew its television deal with the Ivy League, which would have left that league without a television broadcaster for the 2014 season; the channel's increased emphasis on Premier League soccer matches reduced the number of opportunities for the network to carry college football on Saturday afternoons. However, NBCSN reversed its decision and added select Ivy League games beginning in late October 2014 in a joint agreement with Fox College Sports. NBCSN lost its Ivy League rights after the 2017 season as the conference signed an agreement with ESPN the following year, with most games being moved to subscription service ESPN+. The CAA left NBCSN for a one-year deal with CBS Sports Digital and Fox Sports Go in 2018, before signing with FloSports in 2019.

In 2015, the Bayou Classic moved from NBC to NBCSN. In 2020, USA Network exclusively aired one Notre Dame game on September 19, 2020, as overflow for NBC's coverage of the 2020 U.S. Open. A second primetime game was briefly preempted from NBC to USA due to coverage of a speech by 2020 presidential election winner Joe Biden. For the 2021 season, Notre Dame's home opener was aired exclusively on NBCUniversal's new streaming service Peacock. NBCSN shut down at the end of 2021, with its sports properties assumed by Peacock and other NBCUniversal channels.

Acquisition of Big Ten rights (2022–present) 
In 2022, NBC Sports acquired rights to the inaugural HBCU NYC Football Classic game and HBCU Pigskin Showdown all-star game; both events aired on Peacock and CNBC. As part of a contract extension for the Bayou Classic, the game moved back to NBC from the defunct NBCSN. 

In August 2022, it was reported that NBC Sports, along with CBS and current top rightsholder Fox, were the frontrunners for shares of the Big Ten's next round of media rights beginning in 2023. On August 18, 2022, the Big Ten officially announced that it had reached seven-year deals with Fox, CBS, and NBC to serve as its media partners beginning in the 2023–24 season. NBC will air primetime games throughout the regular season under the title Big Ten Saturday Night. All telecasts will be available on Peacock, while eight Big Ten games per-season (including four intraconference games) will be exclusive to Peacock. NBC will carry the Big Ten championship game in 2026, while the contract also includes a package of Big Ten basketball games and Olympic sports coverage for Peacock. On February 2, 2023, NBC announced Noah Eagle, Todd Blackledge, and Kathryn Tappen as the lead broadcast team for Big Ten Saturday Night.

See also
 College football on television

References

External links
 
College Football Live Stream

Football on NBC
NBCSN shows
2006 American television series debuts
2010s American television series
College football television series
Mountain West Conference football